Burscough Bridge railway station (pronounced Burs/co Bridge) is one of two railway stations which serves the town of Burscough in Lancashire, England. It is on the Manchester-Southport Line. It is operated and managed by Northern Trains. A bus interchange has recently been constructed next to the station, including a shop and cafe (both now closed). The station has been identified by Merseytravel as a possible interchange between the Liverpool to Ormskirk line and the Southport to Wigan line in its Liverpool City Region Long Term Rail Strategy.

History 
The station was built by the Manchester and Southport Railway and opened on 9 April 1855, and from January 1885 was part of the Lancashire and Yorkshire Railway (L&YR). The main stone-built station building (no longer in use) was built during this time, in the standard L&YR style. The L&YR amalgamated with the London and North Western Railway on 1 January 1922 and in turn was grouped into the London, Midland and Scottish Railway (LMS) in 1923. 

There was a tragic incident at the station in September 1924 when a member of the public was hit while crossing the line by the staff crossing, rather than obeying the signs and using the road bridge. Alfred Rimmer, aged 55, of Burscough was caught by the first carriage of an express train, knocking him under the wheels. His body was "terribly mutilated".

Nationalisation followed in 1948. When Sectorisation was introduced in the 1980s, the station was served by Regional Railways until the privatisation of British Rail. Both connections have since been lifted, but the formations remain and there have been calls from various parties to reopen them to allow through running from Southport to both Ormskirk and Preston.

The main buildings on the Wigan-bound platform still stand, but are now in private residential use.

Interchange 
This station is not to be confused with Burscough Junction, which is also in Burscough, but on the Ormskirk - Preston line. A bus interchange has been constructed next to the station to transport passengers between Burscough Bridge and Burscough Junction, including a shop and cafe. A ticket office was built within the complex; this opened in 2005, but was closed on 25 June 2016 due to council budget cuts. A public notice from Lancashire County Council informs passengers that the nearest staffed station is either Ormskirk or Parbold.

There is step-free access to both platforms.

Burscough Curves 
During the rail restructuring of the 1960s and 1970s, the "Burscough Curves", which formed a link between the Ormskirk-Preston and Southport-Wigan lines were removed, although the formation survives. The North Curve was taken out of use and severed in July 1969, being lifted in 1973: it was last used for a Saturdays only empty train from Blackpool to Southport. The South Curve was singled in 1970, but remained in use to serve the extensive sidings at the MOD depot located just to the north of Burscough Junction station. It saw its last train in 1982.

The passenger service from Ormskirk to Burscough Junction and on to Southport, which used the southern curve, was withdrawn in 1962 as can be seen from the British Rail London Midland Region Timetable of that year.

Pressure from local transport groups, West Lancashire Borough Council and former Southport MP John Pugh has not so far persuaded Network Rail to reinstate the curves.  Various schemes have been proposed, including the full electrification of the line from Southport via Burscough to Ormskirk using the same third rail system as Merseyrail.  This proposal would allow users of the Ormskirk branch of Merseyrail's Northern Line to reach Southport without having to travel via Sandhills.

In June 2009, the Association of Train Operating Companies, in its Connecting Communities: Expanding Access to the Rail Network report, called for funding for the reopening of this line as part of a £500m scheme to open 33 stations on 14 lines closed in the Beeching Axe, including seven new parkway stations. The uses of the curves in a new service pattern has been identified by Network Rail, if electrified along with the through lines.

Additionally, Network Rail has identified electrification of Wigan to Southport, together with the Ormskirk to Preston Line and the Burscough Curves as a possible source of new services.

Battery trains as enabler to open the curves
The New Merseyrail Fleet A Platform For Future Innovations document, mentions regarding Ormskirk-Preston enhancements, that there is the potential to use battery powered Merseyrail units that may improve the business case for opening the curves. The document states there will be a review after the Merseyrail units have been tested for battery operation in 2020.

MP unification
In March 2020, the MPs for Southport, South Ribble, West Lancs and Preston (Damien Moore, Katherine Fletcher, Rosie Cooper and Sir Mark Hendrick) along with Lancashire County Council leader Geoff Driver united in a bid to pressure Network Rail and the Government to reinstate the curves. The bid that was put forward was seeking just £50,000 funding to look further into feasibility studies and start preparation for a formal business case. However, the Department for Transport made the decision to turn down the application despite the opening statement reading ‘The proposal makes a strong case for the intervention” for social and economic reasons and “a strong transport case with the area suffering from poor connectivity, congestion and air quality issues”

Services 

On Monday to Saturday daytimes, there are two trains an hour westbound to Southport and eastbound to Wigan. Since the May 2019 timetable change, eastbound trains now continue via  to both Manchester stations. Passengers for Manchester Piccadilly,  and points south need to change at Oxford Road. Passengers for Atherton line stations must change trains at Wigan to reach stations on this route.

On Sundays there is an hourly service to Southport and  via Manchester Victoria.  These run via Atherton.

Gallery

See also

Listed buildings in Burscough

References

External links 

Railway stations in the Borough of West Lancashire
DfT Category F1 stations
Former Lancashire and Yorkshire Railway stations
Railway stations in Great Britain opened in 1855
Northern franchise railway stations
Burscough